The Blessing is a comic satirical novel by Nancy Mitford, first published in 1951.

Plot summary
It is set in the post-World War II period and concerns Grace, an English country girl who moves to France after falling for a dashing aristocratic Frenchman named Charles-Edouard who lusts after other women. Their son Sigi aims to keep his parents apart by engineering misunderstandings.

Film adaptation
A 1959 film called Count Your Blessings was based in the novel. It starred Deborah Kerr, Rossano Brazzi, and Maurice Chevalier.

External links
The Official Nancy Mitford Website 

1951 British novels
Novels by Nancy Mitford
British novels adapted into films
Novels set in France
Random House books